Paraliobacillus ryukyuensis is a Gram-positive, extremely halotolerant, alkaliphilic, endospore-forming, slightly halophilic and facultatively anaerobic bacterium from the genus of Paraliobacillus which has been isolated from a decomposing marine alga from Okinawa in Japan.

References

External links 

Type strain of Paraliobacillus ryukyuensis at BacDive -  the Bacterial Diversity Metadatabase

Bacillaceae
Bacteria described in 2003